John Lysaght may refer to:

John Lysaght, 1st Baron Lisle (1702–1781), Irish peer
John Lysaght, 2nd Baron Lisle (1729–1798), Irish peer
John Lysaght, 3rd Baron Lisle (1781–1834), Irish peer
John Lysaght, 5th Baron Lisle (1811–1898), Irish peer
John Lysaght, 7th Baron Lisle (1903–1997), Irish peer

See also 
 John Lysaght and Co.
 Lysaght (Australian company)